Santiago González and Scott Lipsky were the defending champions, but lost to Andre Begemann and Julian Knowle in the first round.
Begemann and Knowle went on to win the title, defeating Marco Chiudinelli and Roger Federer in the final, 1–6, 7–5, [12–10].

Seeds

Draw

Draw

References
 Main Draw

2014 Gerry Weber Open